
Gmina Ryjewo is a rural gmina (administrative district) in Kwidzyn County, Pomeranian Voivodeship, in northern Poland.

Villages
Gmina Ryjewo contains the villages and settlements of Barcice, Benowo, Benowo-Wrzosy, Borowy Młyn, Chojno, Czarne Błoto, Jałowiec, Jarzębina, Klecewko, Kuliki, Mątki, Mątowskie Pastwiska, Pańskie Łąki, Pułkowice, Rudniki, Ryjewo, Sołtyski, Straszewo, Szadówko, Szkaradowo Szlacheckie, Szkaradowo Wielkie, Tralewo, Trzciano, Watkowice, Watkowice Małe and Wiszary.

Neighbouring gminas
Gmina Ryjewo is bordered by the gminas of Gniew, Kwidzyn, Mikołajki Pomorskie, Prabuty and Sztum.

References

Polish official population figures 2006

Ryjewo
Kwidzyn County